Atymna is a genus of treehoppers in the family Membracidae.

Species 

 Atymna atromarginata Goding, 1928
 Atymna castaneae (Fitch, 1851)
 Atymna distincta Plummer, 1938
 Atymna gigantea Plummer, 1938
 Atymna helena (Woodruff, 1915)
 Atymna inornata (Say, 1830)
 Atymna pilosa Funkhouser, 1919
 Atymna querci (Fitch, 1851)
 Atymna reticulata Ball, 1937
 Atymna simplex (Van Duzee, 1908)

References 

Smiliinae